Tony Roy Sinclair (born 5 March 1985) is an English footballer who plays for Carshalton Athletic as a defender.

Career
Sinclair began his career in the youth structure at Gillingham, starting the first year of his scholarship in July 2001 and departing at the end of two years in 2003.

In the summer of 2006, he joined Maidstone United from Beckenham Town. However, he failed to appear for the club's opening Isthmian League Division One South fixture at Hastings United on 17 August 2006 and following discussions with him, on 21 August 2006 the club decided they no longer required his services.

Sinclair signed a one-year contract with Gillingham in July 2010 after impressing on trial, returning to the club where he was a trainee as a teenager. He has also spent time on the books of Beckenham Town, Fisher Athletic, Woking and Welling United. Sinclair made his debut for Gillingham on 7 August 2010, in a home 1–1 draw against Cheltenham Town.

In July 2011, Sinclair was released by Gillingham and signed a one-year deal with Conference National side Lincoln City.

After a spell at Carshalton Athletic, Sinclair made his debut for Dulwich Hamlet in the 5-0 Isthmian League defeat at Maidstone United on 13 October 2012. Unfortunately, just four days later, he was forced to limp off injured after only 12 minutes of his second game, a 2-1 Ishmian League Cup victory at Eastbourne Borough. The injury was diagnosed as a ruptured meniscus and would keep him out of action for the remainder of the season.

References

External links

1985 births
Living people
Footballers from Lewisham
English footballers
Black British sportsmen
Association football defenders
Gillingham F.C. players
Beckenham Town F.C. players
Maidstone United F.C. players
Fisher Athletic F.C. players
Welling United F.C. players
Woking F.C. players
Lincoln City F.C. players
Carshalton Athletic F.C. players
Dulwich Hamlet F.C. players
Greenwich Borough F.C. players
English Football League players